Amphilectus strepsichelifer is a species of demosponges found in the Atlantic waters around Cape Verde, western Africa. The species name is a combination of the Latin strepsis = twisted, and chelifer = bearing chelae, reflecting the twisted condition of the chelae.

The species was discovered in 1986 in the waters of Canal de São Vicente, west of São Vicente, at about 350 m depth, on hard bottom. This is the only place where it has been observed.

References

Poecilosclerida
Fauna of Cape Verde
Animals described in 2012